Hongell is a surname. Notable people with the surname include:

Göran Hongell (1902–1973), Finnish designer
Hilda Hongell (1867–1952), Finnish architect